is the third single by Japanese-American recording artist Joe Inoue, and the last of his singles off of Me! Me! Me!. The single stayed on the Oricon Weekly Singles Charts for 1 week and peaked at 156. The title track was used as a theme song for the Uchikuru!? variety show. Both the title track and "Party Night (Odoritari Night)" are featured on Me! Me! Me!.

Track listing
  – 4:45
 "P.J. Anthem" – 2:31
  – 2:46

References

External links
 Joe Inoue's official website 

2009 singles
Joe Inoue songs
2009 songs
Ki/oon Music singles